Luković is a Serbian surname that may refer to:
Aleksandar Luković, (b. 1924.), Serbian art painter
Aleksandar Luković, (b. 1982), Serbian footballer
 Vojislav Lukovic, ( b.1960), Serbian iconographer and art restorer
 Ivan Lukovic, ( b.1950), Serbian art painter
 Djordje Lukovic, ( b.1983), Serbian art painter
Andrija Luković (b. 1994), Serbian footballer
Goran Luković (b. 1978), Serbian footballer
Milan Luković, Serbian ice hockey goaltender
Stevan M. Luković (1877—1902), Serbian lyric poet
Milorad Ulemek, also known as Luković (b. 1965), Serbian former military commander and criminal

See also
Lukovica (disambiguation)

Serbian surnames